The 34th Golden Globe Awards, honoring the best in film and television for 1976, were held on January 29, 1977.

Winners and nominees

Film

Television

Best Series — Drama
Rich Man, Poor Man
Captains and the Kings
Charlie's Angels
Family
Little House on the Prairie

Best Series — Comedy or Musical
Barney Miller
The Carol Burnett Show
Donny and Marie
Happy Days
Laverne & Shirley
M*A*S*H

Best Television Film
Eleanor and Franklin
Amelia Earhart
Francis Gary Powers: The True Story of the U-2 Spy Incident
I Want to Keep My Baby!
The Lindbergh Kidnapping Case
Sybil

Best Actor — Drama Series
Richard Jordan — Captains and the Kings
Lee Majors — The Six Million Dollar Man
Nick Nolte — Rich Man, Poor Man
Telly Savalas — Kojak
Peter Strauss — Rich Man, Poor Man

Best Actress — Drama Series
Susan Blakely — Rich Man, Poor Man
Angie Dickinson — Police Woman
Farrah Fawcett — Charlie's Angels
Kate Jackson — Charlie's Angels
Jean Marsh — Upstairs, Downstairs
Sada Thompson — Family
Lindsay Wagner — The Bionic Woman

Best Actor — Comedy or Musical Series
Henry Winkler — Happy Days
Alan Alda — M*A*S*H
Michael Constantine — Sirota's Court
Sammy Davis, Jr. — Sammy and Company
Hal Linden — Barney Miller
Freddie Prinze — Chico and the Man
Tony Randall — The Tony Randall Show

Best Actress — Comedy or Musical Series
Carol Burnett — The Carol Burnett Show 
Bernadette Peters — All's Fair
Mary Tyler Moore — The Mary Tyler Moore Show
Isabel Sanford — The Jeffersons
Dinah Shore — Dinah!

Best Supporting Actor
Edward Asner — Rich Man, Poor Man
Tim Conway — The Carol Burnett Show
Charles Durning — Captains and the Kings
Gavin MacLeod — The Mary Tyler Moore Show
Rob Reiner — All in the Family

Best Supporting Actress
Josette Banzet — Rich Man, Poor Man
Adrienne Barbeau — Maude
Ellen Corby — The Waltons
Darleen Carr — Once an Eagle
Julie Kavner — Rhoda
Vicki Lawrence — The Carol Burnett Show
Anne Meara — Rhoda
Sally Struthers — All in the Family

See also
49th Academy Awards
28th Primetime Emmy Awards
29th Primetime Emmy Awards
 30th British Academy Film Awards
 31st Tony Awards
 1976 in film
 1976 in television

References
IMdb 1977 Golden Globe Awards

034
1976 film awards
1976 television awards
January 1977 events in the United States
Golden Globe